Maruranau (Wapishana: Marora Naawa; also: Maruranawa) is an indigenous village of Wapishana Amerindians in the Upper Takutu-Upper Essequibo Region of Guyana. It is located in the Rupununi savannah near the Kwitaro River on the edge of the Kanuku Mountains. A minority of Taruma also inhabit the village.

History 
The Wapishana used to live in small settlements. They were concentrated in larger settlements by the Catholic missionaries. The name of the village means "Giant Armadillo Hill".

Overview 
In October 1947 the first primary school was established in Maruranau. The village has a health centre and shops. There is no electricity, internet or mobile phone. In 2018, water wells were drilled as part of a joint exercise of the Guyana Defence Force and the Brazilian Army. The economy is mainly based on subsistence agriculture, ranching, hunting and fishing. Balata bleeding, a natural latex, used to be part of the economy. The main religions are the Catholic Church and the Open Brethren.

Languages 
Wapishana is the primary language in Maruranau, and English the secondary language. It is one of the few villages which has kept their language alive. Maruranau is also home to three speakers of the Taruma language. They were formerly regarded as its only speakers, but another family has since been discovered in Lethem.

Transport 
Maruranau can be reached by road from Lethem which takes about 4 hours by bus. The village can be accessed by air via the Maruranawa Airport.

References

Indigenous villages in Guyana
Populated places in Upper Takutu-Upper Essequibo